Sharya is a town in Kostroma Oblast, Russia, located on the left bank of the Vetluga River  northeast of Kostroma, the administrative center of the oblast. Population:    26,000 (1974).

History
It was founded in 1906 and granted town status in 1938.

Administrative and municipal status
Within the framework of administrative divisions, Sharya serves as the administrative center of Sharyinsky District, even though it is not a part of it. As an administrative division, it is, together with the urban-type settlement of Vetluzhsky and three rural localities, incorporated separately as the town of oblast significance of Sharya—an administrative unit with the status equal to that of the districts. As a municipal division, the town of oblast significance of Sharya is incorporated as Sharya Urban Okrug.

Twin towns and sister cities

Sharya has one sister city, as designated by Sister Cities International (SCI):
 Great Falls, Montana, United States

References

Notes

Sources

External links
Official website of Sharya 
Sharya TV 
Sharya Business Directory 

Cities and towns in Kostroma Oblast
Sharya Urban Okrug
Vetluzhsky Uyezd